Ion Vatamanu (1 May 1937 in Costiceni – 9 August 1993 in Chișinău) was a writer and politician from Moldova. He was born to Maria and Ion and had a PhD in chemistry. Ion Vatamanu served as member of the Parliament of Moldova (1990–1994) and chairman of the Committee on Culture of the Parliament of Moldova.

Ion Vatamanu died in 1993 and his grave is a monument in Chișinău.

Biography
He was born on 1 May 1937 in the Costiceni commune of Hotin County (today, Chernivtsi Raion, Chernivtsi Oblast), in the family of Ion and Maria Vatamanu. He graduated from the 7th grade school in his native village, then, attended the middle school in the village of Vancicuti, which he graduated in 1954. 
 In the period 1954 to 1955 he worked as a teacher at the Costiceni school.
 In 1955–1960, he studied at the Moldova State University in Chișinău at the Faculty of Chemistry. 
 In 1962, he had his debut with the book of poems „First snowflakes”.
 In 1960, he married Elena Curicheru, a student of philology, a future interpreter, the daughter of Mihail Curicheru, the Bessarabian writer deported to Siberia (where he died in 1943).
 In 1971, he holds a PhD thesis in chemistry at the University of Lviv, Ukraine - Oscillopolographic study of the complexes Bi (3+), Zn (2+), Sb (3+) with appropriate ligands and application of these complexes in analytical chemistry.
 In 1973, he was elected as the head of the laboratory at the Chemistry Institute of the Academy of Science of the Republic of Moldova, this position he held to the end of his life. In all these years of his chemistry career, 1980–1989, Ion Vatamanu published more than 150 scientific papers in the field of analytical chemistry, and received five patents in the field of oscillopolography. Several methods developed by Ion Vatamanu were applied in agriculture and industry of the former Soviet Union and Moldova, at the testing lands in the Telenești and Anenii Noi districts. 
 In 1978 he published, in collaboration with other scientific workers of the Chemistry Laboratory, the Bibliographic Index of the Polarography Literature (1922-1977).
 In 1988 he wrote the monograph on Thermodynamics of hydrolysis of metal ions in collaboration with the young PhD in chemistry Ilie Fitic.
 In the period of 1989 by 1991, together with the poet Leonida Lari, he headed the Glasul newspaper, the first Latin-based post-war newspaper in the Republic of Moldova, printed in Latvia with the support of the Dacia Society.
 In 1991 - 1993 he held the position of the director of the Columna magazine.
 In 1990 he was the MP in the first Parliament of the Republic of Moldova and the chairman of the Parliamentary Committee on Culture and Religious Affairs. He signed the Declaration of Independence of the Republic of Moldova.

He died on 9 August 1993 and was buried in the Central Orthodox Cemetery of Chișinău.

Awards
 Diploma Televiziunii Moldovenești pentru ciclul de emisiuni "Abeceul moralei".

Honours
 The Award Ion Vatamanu "for love of truth and freedom"
 "Ion Vatamanu" High School, Strășeni

Works
 Primii fulgi, prezentat de Nicolae Costenco, - Chișinău, Editura Cartea Moldovenească.
 Monologuri (1964), - Chișinău, Editura Cartea Moldovenească.
 Liniștea Cuvintelor (1971).
 Ora păsării (1974), - Chișinău, Editura Cartea Moldovenească.
 De ziua frunzei (1977), prefață de Grigore Vieru, - Chișinău, Editura Literatura Artistică.
 Iubire de tine (1981).
 Măslinul oglindit (1983).
 Aventurile lui Atomică (1966), - Chișinău, Editura Cartea Moldovenească.
 Teiul (1980).
 Izvorul cu ochi verzi (1985).
 La mijlocul ierbii (1967), prefață de George Meniuc, - Chișinău, Editura Lumina.

References

Bibliography 
 "Literatura și arta Moldovei: Encicl.", Vol. 1. - Chișinău, 1985.
 Mihai Cimpoi, O istorie deschisă a literaturii române din Basarabia. - Chișinău, 1996.
 "Chișinău Enciclopedie" - Editura Museum, Chișinău, 1997.
 Sergiu P. Palii, In memoriam Ion Vatamanu (Commemorating the 75th birth anniversary), Chemistry Journal of Moldova, 2012, Vol. 7(2), pag. 7-8.

External links 
 Biblioteca Municipală B.P.Hașdeu din or.Chișinău: Ion VATAMANU – Bibliografie.
 Biography Ion Vatamanu
 Ion VATAMANU
 Leo Butnaru, PRIETENI, COLEGI, UMBRE DRAGI…

1937 births
1993 deaths
People from Chernivtsi Oblast
Eastern Orthodox Christians from Romania
Moldova State University alumni
Moldovan writers
Moldovan male writers
Moldovan MPs 1990–1994
Popular Front of Moldova MPs